The 2000 St. George Illawarra Dragons season was the second in the joint venture club's history. The Dragons competed in the NRL's 2000 premiership season. The team finished ninth in the regular season, missing out on finals for the first time in their history.

Squad gains and losses

Ladder

Ladder progression

Season results

References 

St. George Illawarra Dragons
St. George Illawarra Dragons seasons
2000 in rugby league by club